The Loudness of Sam (Harcourt) is a story for young children, written and illustrated by James Proimos.

Overview
Sam is a child whose laughs and cries were extraordinarily loud. "Is that nuts and bolts in the blender?" "No, that's just the baby." One day, Sam visits his quiet aunt in the city. On the last day of the visit, she laughs loudly, because the loudness of Sam is contagious!

Television Series
The Loudness of Sam has its own animated television series, produced by the Canadian company Nelvana Enterprises, Inc..

References

1999 children's books
Children's fiction books
American picture books